This is the list of cathedrals in Peru sorted by denomination.

Roman Catholic 
Cathedrals of the Roman Catholic Church in Peru:
 Cathedral of the Virgin of Rosary in Abancay
 Cathedral Basilica of St. Mary in Arequipa
 Cathedral Basilica of St. Mary in Ayacucho
 Cathedral of St. Francis of Assisi in Ayaviri
 Cathedral of St. Catherine in Cajamarca
 Cathedral of St. Joseph in Callao
 Cathedral of the Good Shepherd in Carabayllo
 St. John the Baptist Cathedral in Chachapoyas
 Cathedral of St. Mary in Chiclayo
 Cathedral of Our Lady of Mount Carmel and St. Peter in Chimbote
 Cathedral of the Holy Family in Chulucanas
 Cathedral of the Immaculate Conception in Chuquibamba
 Cathedral Basilica of Our Lady of the Assumption in Cusco
 Cathedral of St. Batholomew in Huacho
 Cathedral of St. Augustine in Huamachuco
 Cathedral of St. Antony in Huancavélica
 Cathedral of the Most Holy Trinity in Huancayo
 Cathedral of the Lord of Burgos in Huánuco
 Cathedral of Saint Sebastian and the Immaculate Conception in Huaraz
 Cathedral of the Lord of Solitude in Huaraz
 St. Jerome Cathedral in Ica
 Cathedral of St. John the Baptist in Iquitos
 Cathedral Basilica of St. John the Apostle and Evangelist in Lima
 Cathedral of St. Peter in Lurín
 St. Dominic Co-Cathedral in Moquegua
 St. James Cathedral in Moyobamba
 Cathedral of St. Michael the Archangel in Piura
 Cathedral of the Immaculate Conception in Pucallpa
 Our Lady of the Rosary Cathedral in Puerto Maldonado
 Cathedral Basilica of St. Charles Borromeo in Puno
 Cathedral of St. Vincent Martyr in San Vicente de Cañete
 Our Lady of the Rosary Cathedral in Tacna
 Cathedral of St. Ann in Tarma
 Cathedral Basilica of St. Mary in Trujillo
 St. Nicholas Cathedral in Tumbes
 Cathedral of Our Lady of the Snows in Yurimaguas

Anglican
Cathedrals of the Anglican Church of the Southern Cone of America:
 Cathedral of the Good Shepherd in Lima

See also
List of cathedrals

References

Cathedrals in Peru
Peru
Cathedrals
Cathedrals